Arjun Gill (born November 6, 1991) is a wrestler competing for Canada. He won a gold medal in the 97 kg freestyle at the 2014 Commonwealth Games in Glasgow. The following year on home soil, Gill won silver at the 2015 Pan American Games in Toronto.

References

1986 births
Living people
Wrestlers at the 2014 Commonwealth Games
Commonwealth Games gold medallists for Canada
Sportspeople from British Columbia
Canadian male sport wrestlers
Pan American Games silver medalists for Canada
Commonwealth Games medallists in wrestling
Pan American Games medalists in wrestling
Wrestlers at the 2015 Pan American Games
Medalists at the 2015 Pan American Games
Canadian people of Punjabi descent
Medallists at the 2014 Commonwealth Games